Hybolasiellus variegatus is a species of beetle in the family Cerambycidae, and the only species in the genus Hybolasiellus. It was described by Broun in 1880.

References

Pogonocherini
Beetles described in 1880